Methylnicotinamide may refer to:

 1-Methylnicotinamide (trigonellamide)
 N-Methylnicotinamide (nicotinyl methylamide)